RavenEye are an English rock band formed in Milton Keynes in 2014. The band consist of blues guitarist Oli Brown on vocals, bassist Aaron Spiers and drummer Adam Breeze. Their sound is reminiscent of and rooted in modern garage rock and blues rock.

Background
Blues guitarist Oli Brown formed RavenEye in Milton Keynes in 2014 along with Australian bassist Aaron Spiers and drummer Kev Hickman. Shortly after the formation, the band toured Europe supporting guitarist Joe Satriani on a two-month tour during the summer of 2014. Festivals in Spain and a UK tour ended the busy opening year for the trio.

In January 2015 the band's first single, Breaking Out received over 100,000 plays on Soundcloud in less than a month and was one of Classic Rock's Tracks of the week featured on their website.

In April 2015, the band supported Swedish rock band Blues Pills in the UK. This was followed by a two-week co-headline tour with Spanish band Last Fair Deal through Spain. Through June and July 2015, the band supported Slash featuring Myles Kennedy and The Conspirators.

The band's debut E.P Breaking Out was released on 28 April 2015. Also released was a music video and lyric video for the titled track of the EP.

After supporting Deep Purple for two dates in France joined again with Slash in November 2015 to tour Eastern Europe. The band toured the UK again in January and February 2016. In August 2016, RavenEye announced their new drummer, Adam Breeze, from Hemel Hempstead after Hickman decided to leave the band. In September 2016, the band released their first full-length album Nova with Frontiers Records, who they signed with in July 2016.

RavenEye were the support act on the Lisbon date of Aerosmith's 2017 Aero-vederci European tour.

Band members

Current members

 Oli Brown – lead vocals, guitar (2014–present)
 Aaron Spiers – backing vocals, bass guitar (2014–present)
 Adam Breeze - drums (2016–present)

Past members
 Kev Hickman – drums (2014–2016)

Discography

EPs
Breaking Out (2015) (self-released)

Studio albums
Nova (2016) (Frontiers Records)

References

External links

 
RavenEye official website

English rock music groups
Frontiers Records artists